The fish drum is a Chinese percussion instrument. The name actually designates two rather different instruments, a membranophone and an idiophone.

Membranophone
The membranophone fish drum is the symbol of Elder Zhang Guo, one of the Eight Immortals. This drum is a long and slender piece of bamboo with a dried fish skin stretched over one end. Two smaller pieces of bamboo resembling golf clubs are used as Castanets.

Idiophone

There is also the idiophone, which is also called a wooden fish. This type of fish drum is used to accompany performers of changben or Chinese narrative ballads. They would accompany their singing on a yugu drum. It is also used as a drum to accompany Cantonese opera. This drum is an idiophone, where the whole body of the instrument vibrates to produce sound. It is a small piece of wood carved into the shape of a fish, with a slit along the length of the body. This drum is then struck by a mallet to produce sound. A much larger version, with much more ornate decoration, symbolizing a mythical fish, whose sounds is supposed to attract divinity, is used in Taoist and Confucian ceremonies. This version of the drum, also struck by a mallet, is hit at regular intervals during Confucian and Taoist ceremonies to mark the intervals of prayer. It is connected with the use of rain prayers and prayers connected to death rites.

See also
Wooden fish

References

Chinese musical instruments
Membranophones
Idiophones